Assembly elections was held in Maharashtra, India on October 13, 2004. The major alliances were the Democratic Front and the Bharatiya Janata Party - Shiv Sena alliance. Other political parties contested were the Bahujan Samaj Party, the Samajwadi Party, the Rashtriya Janata Dal, and the LJP. 66,000 electronic voting machines were used to elect the 288 members of the Maharashtra legislative assembly.

Results

List of Political Parties participated in 2004 Maharashtra Assembly Elections.

The result was announced on October 17, 2004, the Nationalist Congress Party(NCP) emerged as the largest party with 71 Seats along with its ally Congress in second position with 69 Seats.The BJP-Shiv Sena Alliance lost election winning 54 and 62 seats respectively that lead to resignation of Venkaiah Naidu and followed by leading command of party to Lal Krishna Advani.

Summary of results of the Maharashtra State Assembly election, 2004

Region-wise Breakup

Alliance-wise Results

Elected members

References

External links 

"Maharashtra assembly polls on October 13" - rediff.com article dated August 24, 2004
"State Assembly polls on October 13" - Mid-Day articled dated August 24, 2004
"Maharashtra gears up for assembly election" - Hindustantimes.com article dated September 14, 2004

State Assembly elections in Maharashtra
2000s in Maharashtra
2004 State Assembly elections in India